The 1967–68 season was Chelsea Football Club's fifty-fourth competitive season. Manager Tommy Docherty was dismissed early in the season and succeeded by former Chelsea coach Dave Sexton. The club finished 6th in the First Division and reached the quarter-finals of the FA Cup.

Table

References

External links
 1967–68 season at stamford-bridge.com

1967–68
English football clubs 1967–68 season